The 1994–95 Pilkington Cup was the 24th edition of England's premier rugby union club competition at the time. Bath won the competition defeating Wasps in the final. The event was sponsored by Pilkington and the final was held at Twickenham Stadium.

Draw and results

First round (Sep 10)

Second round (Oct 8)

Third round (Nov 5)

Fourth round (Dec 17)

Fifth round (Jan 28)

Quarter-finals (Feb 25)

Semi-finals (Apr 1)

Final

References

1994–95 rugby union tournaments for clubs
1994–95 in English rugby union
1994-95